Come Clean is a 1931 American pre-Code short film starring Laurel and Hardy, directed by James W. Horne and produced by Hal Roach.

Story
Mr. and Mrs. Hardy wish to have a quiet night in their apartment, but are interrupted when Mr. and Mrs. Laurel pay a visit. After Stan says he'd like to go for ice cream, he and Ollie go out to fetch some. On their way back home, they prevent a shrewish woman named Kate from committing suicide. Kate is ungrateful and makes threats against the boys unless they look after her. They spend a frantic evening trying to keep her out of sight from their wives. Kate is eventually hidden in the Hardys' bathroom with Stan.

Kate is shortly exposed and arrested as a wanted criminal by a policeman summoned by the apartment-block doorman, and Stan is informed that he is entitled to a $1,000 reward for her capture. When Stan suggests spending the money on ice cream, Ollie washes him down the bath plughole.

Cast
 Stan Laurel – Stan
 Oliver Hardy – Ollie
 Gertrude Astor – Mrs. Hardy
 Linda Loredo – Mrs. Laurel
 Mae Busch – Kate
 Charlie Hall – Ice cream vendor
 Tiny Sandford – Doorman

Production notes
 The opening scene was a reworking from their silent film Should Married Men Go Home?
 Linda Loredo, who plays Mrs. Laurel, had appeared in several foreign-language versions of several previous short films. This was her only part in an English language Laurel and Hardy film. She died on August 11, 1931, a month before the film's release.
 The film was later reworked into the plot of the 1942 film Brooklyn Orchid (a Hal Roach's Streamliner), starring William Bendix and Joe Sawyer.

References

External links
 
 

1931 films
1931 comedy films
American black-and-white films
Films directed by James W. Horne
Laurel and Hardy (film series)
Films with screenplays by H. M. Walker
American comedy short films
1930s English-language films
1930s American films